Brum, is a British children's television series about the adventures of a small, sentient vintage car. The series was originally narrated by Toyah Willcox, who also provided the voice for Brum and all the characters. The show aired for three series between 1991 and 2002 with two revived CGI series airing on YouTube in 2016. The show was first aired on BBC One on the children's block, Children's BBC (CBBC) and later on CBeebies.

Set in Birmingham, England (referred to as "Big Town" in the series) and produced by Ragdoll Productions, Brum was first broadcast in 1991 and the last live-action series was broadcast in 2002. It was initially directed, written and produced by Anne Wood and initially narrated by Toyah Willcox who also provided the voice for Brum and all the characters in story form. In series 3, all the characters including Brum were silent except for the car noises. The narrator provided commentary rather than the previous story form. A new CGI-animated series, aimed at young pre-school children, was produced in 2016.

Plot and setting

Brum is the story of a small, sentient replica car who ventures out into Big Town when his owner isn't looking and gets up to all manner of adventures. Each episode begins and ends in the same way, with Brum leaving the other cars in the motor museum when the owner's back is turned and heading out to explore Big Town, before eventually returning to his place. Each series has had its own background music. From series 1–2, the introduction music was the same, but in series 2, they used different instruments. From Series 3, the music became jazzy and a new title sequence was directed by Nigel P. Harris.

The car can express himself in various mechanical ways including opening and closing his doors and bonnet, bobbing his suspension, and flashing and swivelling. The actors in Brum do not speak – mime and off-screen narration help propel the story. It was therefore easy to prepare episodes for airing in other countries, and the series has been broadcast in many parts of the world and in many languages.

The stories are mostly set in the city of Birmingham, England, since in addition to its onomatopoeic nature of a car engine revving, Brum (as a contraction of "Brummagem") is a common colloquial name for Birmingham. Although later series make no direct mention of Birmingham, calling it simply Big Town, many of the city's streets and landmarks can be seen in each episode.

The show was written by a range of writers. Anne Wood primarily wrote all the first series, while the second was written by Tom Poole, Dirk Campbell, Andrew Davenport and Morgan Hall. The last two series were written by Nigel P. Harris (5 Episodes) and the existing Ragdoll team.

The car itself – a half-scale replica of a late-1920s Austin 7 Chummy convertible – was designed and built by Rex Garrod. It is now housed at the Cotswold Motoring Museum in Bourton-on-the-Water, Gloucestershire, which is also where the opening and closing sequences of the programme were filmed.

Characters

1990s
 Museum Owner (Mike Cavanagh): The owner of the car museum where Brum lives. He is the only human character who appears in every episode and the only character who is apparently oblivious to Brum's adventures, despite finding items in Brum's backseat at the end of each episode in Series 1 and 2. The actor, Mike Cavanagh, actually owned the Cotswold Motor Museum until 1999. He passed away in 2021 and there is a plaque dedicated to him on the wall at the entrance to the Museum.
 The Lollipop Lady (Shirley-Anne Bohm): A lady who helps people, and Brum, cross the road safely, she appears in every episode in the second series.
 WPC Truncheon (Deborah Grant): the police officer in Big Town.
 The Big Town Robber (Andrew Davenport): Always up to mischief, the robber's antics include stealing the trophy for the big race. Brum is usually the one that foils his plans as seen in "Brum and the Big Chase/Dancing in the Street", and "Brum and the Big Town Race/Brum and the Trophy".
 Mr. and Mrs. La-Di-Dah: A posh married couple who regularly featured in the second series.
 Mr. and Mrs. Doolally (Mark Barnsley): A friendly, if slightly absent-minded, couple who regularly featured in the first and second series.
 Vicky Spoon: A regular cast member of the second series, Vicky is Brum's special friend.
 Micky Mender: A handyman, a regular cast member of the second series.
 Big Town Bullies (Shazad Mahmood and Georgina Treharne) 
 The Scrap Dealers (Dave Evans and Mark Walter) 
 Two Masked Bank Robbers (Robert Goodman and Barry Robinson)
 Newspaper Boy (Daniel Brocklebank)

2000s

Townspeople
 Traffic Policeman (Mark Powlett): A "knockabout" policeman, who owns a horse called Arrow who loves being fed apples. He wishes to sing in Big Town's pop band, and always followed the rules when he was younger.
 Granny Slippers (Linda Kerr Scott): An old lady who wears slippers wherever she goes. She also has a kitten named Lucky.
 The Visiting Man (Jos Houben): A tourist who loves taking photographs with his camera, especially Brum.
 Mr. Brillo (Rob Thirtle): A man who lives next door to Granny Slippers. He has a wide collection of garden gnomes and wishes to own over 100 of them. His favourite gnome is a 342-year-old one named Gnorman. His favourite picture is the Gnoma Lisa.
 Gorgeous Gordon (Enoch White): A self-centred, full-of-himself hairdresser who wears a wig as hair.
 Bob & Job (Kevin McGreevy & Adam Schumacher): Two comically clumsy men, who wear green dungarees and yellow T-shirts and help the town in a way of slapstick style from Laurel and Hardy.
 Scruffy: Brum's friend, a dog who loves burying things.
 Big Town Mayor (John Woodford): The town manager.
 The Visiting Lady (Iona Kennedy / Carole Davies): The Visiting Man's wife who lives in the town.
 The Mayoress: The mayor of Big Town 
 The Celebrity (Johnnie Fiori): A celebrity who appeared in the episode 'Brum and the Airport Adventure' when she had her jewels stolen by Bubble & Squeak at the Big Town Airport.
 Sally: A woman in the Big Town who had her cake stolen by teenagers on her birthday in the episode "Brum and the Birthday Cake/Brum and the Cake Gang".
 Policewoman (Lisa Allen)

Thieves
 Rob & Nick (Dan Carey and Jason Segade): A bumbling pair of thieves who are best known for stealing Mr. Brillo's gnome, robbing the golf buggy at the Big Town Golf Course, a posh celebrity's dog, Money hat from the artist and a waiter's apron at the pizza restaurant. 
 Bubble & Squeak (Chalky Skywalker Chawner and Paul Jackson): A pair of thieves who love anything shiny, especially jewels. They wear clothes that never fit because they were stolen from washing lines. They appeared in Brum and the Airport Adventure, Brum and the Bank Robbers/Brum and the Heavy Safe, and Brum and the Golden Loo.
 Big Bad (Paul Filipiak): Appeared in Brum and the Pantomime Cow/Brum and the Theatrical Thieves, Brum and the Snow Thieves, Brum and the Splash and Grab and Brum - Chasing Balloons.
 Big Bad's 1st Girlfriend (Christine Nayrolles): Appeared in Brum and the Snow Thieves, Brum and the Shop Window Dummy/Brum and the Mannequin. 
 Big Bad's 2nd Girlfriend (Kay Stanley): Appeared in Brum and the Splash and Grab. 
 Big Bad's Assistant's Girlfriend (Justine Marriott): Appeared in Bushes on the Run.
 Big Bad's Assistant (Eric Mallett): Appeared in Brum and the Pantomime Cow/Brum and the Theatrical Thieves with Big Bad, Bushes on the Run with his girlfriend.
 The Shadow (Miles Anthony): A menacing thief who appeared in Brum and the King of Thieves and Brum and the Gorilla Caper.
 Pickpocket Polly (Catherine Marimer): A thief who stole a wallet from a visiting man, and, of course, she took the items from people and put them in her swag bag.
 Penny Pincher (Julia West): Appeared in Brum and the Music Box and Brum and the Stopwatch Botch.
 Cake Gang: (Kerry Dean, Gavin Cooper, David Smith, Charmaine Samuels and Liam Mullan): A group of greedy teenagers who stole a birthday cake from Sally in "Brum and the Birthday Cake/Brum and the Cake Gang".
 Magic Paul (Andy Dawson): a Magician who is his assistant of Pickpocket Polly
 The Beady-Eyed Robber (Heather Tyrrell): Appeared in Brum and the Stolen Necklace.

Episodes

Series 1 (1991)
 1. Brum to the Rescue - 26 September 1991
 2. Brum and the Kite – 3 October 1991
 3. Brum and the Scrapyard – 10 October 1991
 4. Brum at the Opera – 17 October 1991
 5. Brum and the Mad Mower – 24 October 1991
 6. Brum at the Seaside – 31 October 1991
 7. Brum and the Little Girl Lost – 7 November 1991
 8. Brum and the Wheels – 14 November 1991
 9. Brum and the Removal Van – 28 November 1991
 10. Brum and the Magician – 5 December 1991
 11. Brum and the Runaway Pram – 12 December 1991
 12. Brum on Safari – 19 December 1991
 13. Brum and the Stilt Walker – 26 December 1991

Series 2 (1994)
The second series of the show was first broadcast on Children's BBC in October 1994 and consisted of thirteen episodes with the runtime of each episode being increased to 15 minutes. Toyah Wilcox reprised her role as the narrator. 

Most episodes of this series were later edited by the BBC in the late 90s cutting the length of the episodes down to 10 minutes to fit with the runtime of the first series. These were broadcast until 2001.
 1. Brum and the Helicopter – 6 October 1994
 2. Brum and the Crane – 13 October 1994
 3. Brum Goes Ice Skating – 20 October 1994
 4. Brum Dances in the Street – 27 October 1994
 5. Brum at a Wedding – 3 November 1994
 6. Brum and the Rascally Robber – 10 November 1994
 7. Brum and the Supermarket – 17 November 1994
 8. Brum and the Very Windy Day – 24 November 1994
 9. Brum and the Street Party – 1 December 1994
 10. Brum and the Naughty Kitten – 8 December 1994
 11. Brum and the Marching Band – 15 December 1994
 12. Brum and the Flood – 22 December 1994
 13. Brum Goes House Painting – 29 December 1994

Series 3 (2001-2002)
The third series featured a brand new format, depicting Brum is a car, where he stops thieves and even has his own song at the end of every episode ("Brum Gets Things Done"). There is no narrator in this series but instead, it has children commenting on what is happening. There were 40 episodes broadcast across 2001 and 2002 on CBBC One and CBeebies.
 1. Brum and the Airport Adventure – 3 September 2001
 2. Brum and the Naughty Dog – 10 September 2001
 3. Brum and the Pizzeria – 17 September 2001
 4. Brum and the Gymnast – 24 September 2001
 5. Brum and the King of Thieves – 1 October 2001
 6. Brum and the Skateboarding Bride – 8 October 2001
 7. Brum and the Balloons – 15 October 2001
 8. Brum and the Necklace – 22 October 2001
 9. Brum and the Theatrical Thieves – 29 October 2001
 10. Brum and the Runaway Train – 5 November 2001
 11. Brum and the Cake Gang – 12 November 2001
 12. Brum and the Mobile Phone – 19 November 2001
 13. Brum and the Bushes – 26 November 2001
 14. Brum and the Posh Dog – 3 December 2001
 15. Brum and the Music Box – 10 December 2001
 16. Brum and the Statue Rescue - 17 December 2001
 17. Brum and the Snow Thieves – 27 December 2001
 18. Brum and the Kitten Rescue - 8 April 2002
 19. Brum and the River Race – 15 April 2002
 20. Brum and the Golden Loo – 22 April 2002
 21. Brum and the Golf Buggy – 29 April 2002
 22. Brum the Football Hero – 19 April 2022
 23. Brum and the Rampant Robot – 13 May 2002
 24. Brum and the Mannequin – 20 May 2002
 25. Brum and the Bowling Alley – 27 May 2002
 26. Brum and the Basketball – 3 June 2002
 27. Brum and the Gorilla Caper – 10 June 2002
 28. Brum and the Runaway Sofa  – 17 June 2002
 29. Brum and the Garden Gnome – 24 June 2002
 30. Brum and the Runaway Ball – 1 July 2002
 31. Brum and the Stunt Bike – 2 September 2002
 32. Brum and the Stopwatch Botch – 9 September 2002
 33. Brum and the Cream Balloon – 16 September 2002
 34. Brum and the Pickpocket – 23 September 2002
 35. Brum and the New Gnome – 30 September 2002
 36. Brum and the Mouse – 7 October 2002
 37. Brum and the Heavy Safe – 14 October 2002
 38. Brum and the Runaway Rickshaw – 21 October 2002
 39. Brum and the Artist – 28 October 2002
 40. Brum and the Crazy Chair Chase – 4 November 2002

Development
During development of the third season, Ragdoll renewed Video Collection International's Home Video deal on June 12, 2001, for seven years, in addition to the BBC acquiring the broadcast rights to the season. On August 31, Ragdoll announced that the new season would premiere on September 3, with the first VHS/DVD release of the new series to coincide on October 8. On October 7, Ragdoll launched the show internationally at MIPCOM, where the Australian Broadcasting Corporation acquired the Australian broadcast rights for the series to air on ABC for Kids in December, and on the ABC Kids channel in Spring 2002. The show would premiere on ABC TV on March 11, 2002.

On January 17, 2002, Ragdoll announced that the series would be one of the launching programs on the then-upcoming CBeebies channel in the United Kingdom. By MIPTV 2002 on April 15, Ragdoll pre-sold the series to KRO in the Netherlands to air on their Z@ppelin channel's Kindertijd strand. They also announced that after MIPCOM 2001, NRK in Norway, SVT in Sweden and Kids Central in Singapore had also acquired the rights to the series in their respective countries. On September 6, TV3 in New Zealand and RTE's Network 2 in Ireland acquired the broadcast rights, and premiered the series on September 7 and September 10, respectively.

Discovery Communications later acquired the US-broadcast rights to the series and launched it on the Ready Set Learn block on The Learning Channel and Discovery Kids in February 2003. In March, Ragdoll announced RTV Family Entertainment as the German partner for the series, with RTV confirming they would broadcast the show on their Ravensburger TV block on Super RTL at the end of June.

DHX Media revivals
February 2016 saw the release of a rebooted Brum, made by the current owners of the franchise DHX Media. The show is now takes place in a white-coloured setting instead of Big Town and features new friends for Brum. The first episode, "Brum's Car Wash Adventure", premiered on 4 March 2016 via the official Brum YouTube channel. A total of 25 CGI episodes were produced, with a second series currently airing.

Another series, this time animated using Toon Boom Harmony Animation called "Brum & Friends" premiered on the channel in September 2017.

Kiddie ride
A coin operated kiddie ride of Brum was made by Amutec Ltd. The first version contains the original Brum theme song, and the second and third versions contain the rebooted closing credits song aka "Brum Gets Things Done."

UK VHS/DVD Releases
 Brum - Rescue and Other Stories (1991) (VHS)
 Brum - Wheels and Other Stories (1992) (VHS)
 Learn with Brum: Safari Park and other stories (1992) (VHS)
 Brum: Stilts, Seaside & Rescue (1994) (Watch & Play VHS)
 Children's Choice (Rosie & Jim, Playbox and Brum) (1992) (compilation VHS which contains the episode, "Brum and the Pram")
 Brum - Bumper Special: Seaside and 9 Other Stories (1993) (VHS)
 Brum: 2 on 1 - Rescue/Wheels and other stories (1995) (VHS)
 Brum and the Helicopter and Other stories (1994) (VHS)
 Brum - The Big Chase and other stories (1995) (VHS)
 Brum - The Naughty Kitten and Other Stories (1995) (VHS)
 Brum - The Little Drummer Boy and other stories (1995) (VHS)
 My Little Brum - Brum and the Big Chase/Brum is an Ice Skating Star (1996) (VHS)
 My Little Brum - Brum and the Helicopter/Brum and the Wedding (1996) (VHS)
 Brum - Biggest Party Video (1998) (VHS)
 Brum: Airport and Other Stories (2001) (VHS/DVD) 
 Brum: Airport and Other Stories (2002) (VHS) (Marks & Spencer Re-Release) (This includes "Brum and the Runaway Train" as a bonus episode. This version was only released on VHS)
 Brum: Snow Thieves and Other Stories (2002) (VHS/DVD)
 Brum: Runaway Statue (2002) (The VHS was released in 2002, the DVD was released in 2004)
 Brum: Soccer Hero and Other Stories (The VHS was released in 2002, whilst the DVD was issued in 2004, it was only released in a carry case form)
 Brum: Stunt Bike Rescue and Other Stories (2003) (VHS/DVD)
 Brum: Crazy Chair Chase and other stories (2003) (VHS/DVD)
 Brum - Kitten Rescue and other stories (2003) (VHS/DVD)
 Brum - Stopwatch Botch and other stories (2004) (VHS/DVD)
 The Very Best of Brum (2004) (VHS/DVD) (The DVD release is the only Brum home media release to feature the "Brum and the Pickpocket" episode as a bonus episode, making this the only episode unavailable on VHS).

References

External links
 

1991 British television series debuts
2002 British television series endings
1990s British children's television series
2000s British children's television series
BBC children's television shows
British children's adventure television series
TLC (TV network) original programming
Television series by DHX Media
Television series by Mattel Creations
Television series by Ragdoll Productions
Australian Broadcasting Corporation original programming
English-language television shows
Fictional cars
Television shows set in Birmingham, West Midlands
British television shows featuring puppetry
CBeebies
HIT Entertainment
British preschool education television series
1990s preschool education television series
2000s preschool education television series
British television series revived after cancellation